Paraguay participated in the 2010 Summer Youth Olympics in Singapore.

Athletics

Girls
Field Events

Swimming

Table tennis

Individual

Team

Tennis

Singles

Doubles

References

External links
Competitors List: Paraguay

2010 in Paraguayan sport
Nations at the 2010 Summer Youth Olympics
Paraguay at the Youth Olympics